Arrington is a census-designated place (CDP) in Nelson County, Virginia, United States. The population as of the 2010 Census was 708. Harmony Hill Bed and Breakfast is the only lodging location in Arrington, run by innkeepers Wendie and Jay Fines.  

Mitchell's Brick House Tavern was listed on the National Register of Historic Places in 2006.

Climate
The climate in this area is characterized by hot, humid summers and generally mild to cool winters.  According to the Köppen Climate Classification system, Arrington has a humid subtropical climate, abbreviated "Cfa" on climate maps.

References

Virginia Trend Report 2: State and Complete Places (Sub-state 2010 Census Data)

Census-designated places in Nelson County, Virginia